ŽNK Katarina Zrinski is a Croatian women's association football club based in Čakovec. The club was founded in 2012.

Recent seasons

References

Women's football clubs in Croatia
Association football clubs established in 2012
2012 establishments in Croatia